Burger Chef was an American fast-food restaurant chain. It began operating in 1954 in Indianapolis, Indiana, expanded throughout the United States, and at its peak in 1973 had 1,050 locations, including some in Canada. The chain featured several signature items, such as the Big Shef and Super Shef hamburgers.

In 1982, the General Foods Corporation, owners of the Burger Chef trademark and name, divested itself of the restaurant chain, gradually selling to the owners of Hardee's. The final restaurant to carry the Burger Chef name closed in 1996.

History

In 1954, Frank and Donald Thomas patented the flame broiler in their parent company General Equipment Corporation and started their restaurant in Indianapolis, Indiana. In 1957, they opened their first Burger Chef.

Burger Chef spread across the United States, following a strategy of opening outlets in smaller towns.

By 1972, its number of locations (1,200) was surpassed only by McDonald's (1,600). They offered a double burger, called the Big Shef, and later the quarter-pound (113 gram) hamburger, Super Shef. Subsequently, they added the Works Bar, where customers added their own toppings to hamburgers.

In 1968, General Foods Corporation purchased the chain and continued its rapid expansion. At the time of the purchase by General Foods, Burger Chef had 600 locations in 39 states.

By 1969, international expansion was underway with General Foods building ten Burger Chef outlets in Australia. The expansion ended in 1975 with a US$1.3 million loss (equivalent to $ million in ). It was stated that Australians disliked the limited burger menu compared to varied options available from milk bars. The chain had two mascots: Burger Chef, voiced by Paul Winchell, and Jeff (the chef's juvenile sidekick).

In 1972, the chain introduced the Funburger, a hamburger with packaging that included puzzles and a small toy. The following year, the chain introduced the Funmeal, the first kid’s meal that included a burger, french fries, a drink, a cookie, and a small toy; with expanded packaging that included stories about Burger Chef and Jeff's adventures and friends (including the magician Burgerini, vampire Count Fangburger, talking ape Burgerilla, and Cackleburger the witch), with riddles and puzzles. When McDonald's introduced their Happy Meal in 1979, the chain sued, but ultimately lost.

In 1982, General Foods sold Burger Chef to the Canadian company Imasco, which also owned Hardee's, for US$44 million (equivalent to $ million in ). Imasco converted many locations to Hardee's restaurants and let franchises and locations near existing Hardee's locations convert to other brands. Remaining restaurants that did not convert to Hardee's or new names and branding simply closed.

Hardee's brought back the Big Shef hamburger for a limited time in 2001, 2007, and 2014 at some Midwestern locations.

Trademark suit
In January 2007, River West Brands, LLC, of Chicago, Illinois, sued Hardee's Food Systems in the US Patents and Trademarks Office, claiming abandonment of the Burger Chef trademark.

On April 16, 2009, River West Brands dropped their petition for cancellation, and both parties agreed to pay their own attorneys' fees.

Slogans
1980–1996: "Nowhere else but Burger Chef."
1976–1980: "We really give you the works." and "Open wide America, you never can forget. You get more to like at Burger Chef."
1971–1976: "You get more to like at Burger Chef."
1970–1971: "There's more to like at Burger Chef." and "Burger Chef goes all out to please your family."

See also
 Burger Chef murders
 List of defunct fast-food restaurant chains
 List of hamburger restaurants

References

Further reading
  Self published.

External links

 Hardee's trademark trial on the US Patent and Trademark Office
 Burger Chef Memories
 JFS' tribute site
 Burger Chef former locations at Waymarking.com

Defunct fast-food chains in the United States
Restaurants established in 1954
Fast-food hamburger restaurants
Defunct restaurants in Indianapolis
Restaurants disestablished in 1996
1954 establishments in Indiana
1996 disestablishments in Indiana
Defunct restaurant chains in the United States
General Foods